Shigeaki "Shige" Hattori (服部 茂章, November 3, 1963) is a Japanese professional race car driver and team owner based in the United States. As a driver, he competed in the CART and IndyCar Series, and the NASCAR Craftsman Truck Series (now the Gander RV & Outdoors Truck Series). He is not related to Naoki Hattori, whom he briefly raced against in CART.

As an owner, Hattori owns Hattori Racing Enterprises, which currently competes full-time in the NASCAR Camping World Truck Series and the ARCA Menards Series East. HRE also has competed part-time in the Xfinity Series and the ARCA Menards Series in the past. The team has fielded cars for Johnny Sauter, Alex Bowman, Austin Hill, Max McLaughlin, David Garbo Jr., Lee Pulliam, Brett Moffitt, Sergio Pena, Ross Kenseth, Jesse Little, and Ryan Truex. His race team won the 2018 NASCAR Camping World Truck Series championship with Brett Moffitt.

Racing career
Prior to moving to the United States, Hattori won the Formula Toyota championship in 1994.

Indy Lights
Hattori moved to the United States in 1995, and began competing in the Indy Lights series in 1996 at the age of 32. After finishing 13th and 25th in points in his first two seasons, he scored his first career win in the series in 1996 at the season-opener at Homestead Miami Speedway. He would win two races that season and finish 14th in points.

CART
Hattori raced for Bettenhausen in CART in 1999, but after he spun the car 18 times in 7 races, he had his CART competition license revoked at Mazda Raceway Laguna Seca by chief steward Wally Dallenbach Sr.  He started 7 races, with a best finish of 15th at Gateway International Raceway.

IRL
Hattori raced in the Indy Racing League from 2000 to 2003. His best IRL finish was a 6th at Texas Motor Speedway in 2002 and he finished 13th in IRL points in 2001 for Treadway-Vertex Cunningham Racing. He led a total of 28 laps in his 26 series starts.

NASCAR
Hattori attempted his first race in the Craftsman Truck Series at the season-finale at Homestead Miami Speedway in 2004, with sponsorship from Aisin AW. He failed to qualify his No. 01 Toyota Tundra.

Hattori was signed to drive the No. 9 Tundra for Germain Racing (then Germain-Arnold Racing) for 2005, his rookie season in the Truck Series, with sponsorship from Aisin AW. He failed to qualify in several races, and was released at the end of the season after competing in 10 events and finishing 35th in series points.

Team ownership

Beginning in 2008, Hattori has fielded entries in NASCAR and ARCA competition under the Hattori Racing Enterprises banner. On August 18, 2013, he made his debut as a NASCAR Camping World Truck Series team owner, fielding the No. 16 Goodyear of Japan Toyota at Michigan International Speedway in the National Guard 200. The team finished 17th with driver Brett Moffitt. Hattori's team returned in 2014, fielding the 80 in several Nationwide series events. In 2015, the team fielded the No. 18 for Ross Chastain at Michigan, but he failed to qualify after the rain interrupted. Later on, the team hosted Ross Kenseth's first Truck start in the No. 18 at the fall Martinsville event.

In 2016, Ryan Truex took over Hattori's Truck ride (renumbered from the No. 18 to the No. 81 due to Kyle Busch Motorsports re-taking that number). After the team gave Truex that chance, he nearly won the season-opening race at Daytona, where he finished second. After that strong run, the team and Truex said they would try to run the full season, which ended up not happening due to sponsorship issues. However, Truex drove part-time for the team in select races for the remainder of the season. The two parties ran the full 2017 season in the renumbered No. 16, but Truex was released prior to the 2018 season.

Moffitt returned to HRE in 2018. Despite sponsorship concerns that threatened to cut their season short, Moffitt and HRE went on to win that year's championship. Nevertheless, troubles with funding resulted in Moffitt's release. Austin Hill would take over the No. 16 in 2019. The team expanded to two trucks in 2022 with Tyler Ankrum and Chase Purdy.

In 2022, Hattori formed Hattori Motorsports to compete in the GT4 America Series with Seth Lucas and Matt Plumb.

Racing record

American open-wheel racing results
(key) (Races in italics indicate fastest lap)

Indy Lights

CART

IndyCar Series

Indianapolis 500

NASCAR
(key) (Bold – Pole position awarded by qualifying time. Italics – Pole position earned by points standings or practice time. * – Most laps led.)

Craftsman Truck Series

References

External links
 
 

1963 births
Living people
Atlantic Championship drivers
Champ Car drivers
Indianapolis 500 drivers
Indy Lights drivers
IndyCar Series drivers
Japanese racing drivers
NASCAR drivers
NASCAR team owners
Sportspeople from Okayama Prefecture
Japanese IndyCar Series drivers
Bettenhausen Racing drivers
A. J. Foyt Enterprises drivers